Gonzalo Eulogio Zárate (born 6 August 1984 in Rosario, Santa Fe) is an Argentine footballer who currently plays as a forward for Swiss club FC Black Stars Basel.

Career
In Summer 2007, Zárate joined SC Kriens of Swiss Challenge League. His high goal scoring rate attracted Grasshopper, and there was made a loan deal on 15 September 2007.

Before moving to Switzerland, he played for PCC San José of the local league, called Asociación Rosarina de Fútbol in the Primera División B in Argentina. He also played in the youth of Lanús and Tiro Federal.

On May 18, 2010, it was announced that Zárate was signed by Red Bull Salzburg. On July 13, Zárate scored his first goal in his first match for Red Bull Salzburg. The goal was in the Champions-League qualifying match versus HB Torshaven.

In September 2019, Zárate joined Swiss Promotion League club FC Black Stars Basel.

Career statistics

Honours

FC Red Bull Salzburg
Austrian Football Bundesliga: 2012
Austrian Cup: 2012

FC Vaduz
Liechtenstein Football Cup: 2016-17

References

External links
Guardian statistics
 

1984 births
Living people
Argentine footballers
Argentine expatriate footballers
Swiss Super League players
Austrian Football Bundesliga players
Cypriot First Division players
Swiss Promotion League players
SC Kriens players
Grasshopper Club Zürich players
FC Red Bull Salzburg players
BSC Young Boys players
FC Thun players
FC Vaduz players
Enosis Neon Paralimni FC players
FC Lausanne-Sport players
FC Black Stars Basel players
Association football forwards
Argentine expatriate sportspeople in Switzerland
Argentine expatriate sportspeople in Austria
Argentine expatriate sportspeople in Liechtenstein
Argentine expatriate sportspeople in Cyprus
Expatriate footballers in Switzerland
Expatriate footballers in Austria
Expatriate footballers in Liechtenstein
Expatriate footballers in Cyprus
Footballers from Rosario, Santa Fe